Kuravilangad is an Indian town located in the northern part of the Kottayam district in Kerala. It is situated in the Meenachil taluk, about 22 km north of the district capital Kottayam and 17 km west of the municipal town Pala.

Kuravilangad is the largest town in the northern side of the Kottayam district. It includes the entire Kuravilangad panchayath, including Thottuva, Kappumthala, Vakkad, Kurianad, Mannakkanad, Elakkad, and Kalathoor. 

Kuravilangad is known for Marian pilgrim center Kuravilangad Church, officially known as St. Mary's Syro-Malabar Major Archiepiscopal Church Kuravilangad. According to tradition this church was founded in 105 AD.

Education
Kuravilangad is the local hub of education, which caters education to students from both Kottayam and Ernakulam District. Notable educational institutes include Deva Matha College, Kuravilangad St Marys's HS, St. Anne's HSS, De Paul HSS, Chavara Hills High School, and St. Marys Girls High School.

Notable residents

The 10th President of India, Kocheril R. Narayanan, briefly was in Kuravilangad, and matriculated from St. Mary's Boys High School (1936–38). <

References

External links 

Official website of Kottayam District

Villages in Kottayam district